State Route 527 (SR 527) is a north–south state highway in the southern portion of the U.S. state of Ohio.  Its southern terminus is at the Ohio River in Chesapeake, where the Robert C. Byrd Bridge carries travelers across to Huntington, West Virginia.  Its northern terminus is at State Route 7 at the partially completed Chesapeake bypass just northeast of the Chesapeake corporation limits. SR 527 is one of the few state routes in Ohio that connects to the same numbered route in a neighboring state, becoming West Virginia Route 527.

Route description
SR 527 heads north from the southern terminus as a four–lane highway.  The route begins a signed concurrency with SR 7 at a traffic light, however unlike other concurrencies in the state, the higher numbered highway is officially designated on the road. SR 527 continues north while SR 7 has an official gap in the road. The northern terminus of SR 527 is at an incomplete trumpet interchange with SR 7, with SR 7 heading southwest and some modified ramps providing access to nearby local and county roads.

None of SR 527 is included as a part of the National Highway System (NHS).

History

1979 – Routing changed to its current alignment; former alignment certified as U.S. Route 52.

From 1938 to 1941
1938 – Originally routed from Ghent (in Bath Township) to Kent along previously and currently unnumbered roads.
1941 – Route decertified.

Major intersections

References

External links

527
Transportation in Lawrence County, Ohio
State highways in the United States shorter than one mile
U.S. Route 52